State Road 294 (SR 294) is a very short state highway that connects State Road 295 and U.S. Highway 98 (US 98) on Chiefs Way in West Pensacola, Florida.

Route description
SR 294 begins at an intersection with New Warrington Road, which carries SR 295 north and south. SR 294 heads east along Chiefs Way, a two-lane street which serves local businesses. It intersects Old Corry Field Road (County Road 295A) near its eastern end. An intersection with US 98, along Navy Boulevard, marks the end of SR 294.

Major intersections

References

External links

Florida State Road 294 (AARoads)

294
294
State highways in the United States shorter than one mile
Pensacola metropolitan area